Anthony Blair ( – September 26, 1879) was an African-American convicted for the murder of his 16-year-old stepdaughter Maggie Blair. He was executed by hanging, the first such execution to occur in Hamblen County, Tennessee.

Background
Blair lived with his stepdaughter Maggie in Washington County near Jonesborough. Maggie had left Blair's house and, from May 1879, lived and worked for William Donaldson in Hamblen County. She was described as very smart and industrious. Blair learned of her whereabouts and on July 29 went to Russellville, Tennessee, immediately making his way to the Donaldson residence. He entered the kitchen, where Maggie was preparing dinner with Mrs. Donaldson. Blair told Maggie that he had something to say to her and asked her to come outside the house. She refused, saying he could say what he had to say in front of Mrs. Donaldson. Around this time, William Donaldson rode up and Blair immediately left the house.

Murder
The following night on Wednesday, Maggie went with others to the prayer meeting at the black church near Russellville. Returning, Blair passed on persons who had been to the church service. He headed on to Russellville after some conversation but after going a short distance, turned back and took another road where the young people, including Maggie, had taken. He overtook the party and immediately walked up to his stepdaughter, who was walking in the rear with a black boy named Taylor. Pushing Taylor away, he caught her hand and said: "You must go home with me on the train tonight to your grandpa", and pulled her along the road 150 to 200 yards, saying she should go. Maggie struggled to loosen herself from his grasp, saying she would rather die than go, whereupon he drew a pistol and shot her twice. She died the following Saturday, aged 16.

Execution
After being convicted at trial, Blair's execution was set for September 26, and a crowd estimated at eight to ten thousand came to watch. A reporter described the day's events:

References

External links

1849 births
1879 deaths
19th-century executions by the United States
19th-century executions of American people
American murderers of children
American people convicted of murder
Executed African-American people
People convicted of murder by Tennessee
People executed by Tennessee by hanging
People executed for murder
Executed people from Tennessee
People from Washington County, Tennessee
1879 murders in the United States